Casimir Catholic College is an independent Roman Catholic comprehensive co-educational secondary day school, located in the Sydney suburb of Marrickville, New South Wales, Australia.

History
Casimir catholic college was formed in 1966 from the merger of De La Salle College, a boys' school, and St Brigid's Girls' School, which had existed since the 1921s. The founder of both schools was the parish priest Father Casimir Maguire, and so the amalgamated school took his name.

Philosophy
The college adheres to the values and customs of the three orders involved in its history: the Good Samaritan Sisters, the De La Salle Brothers and the Passionist Fathers. Casimir is located within a very multicultural area of Sydney and the school embraces the richness and diversity this brings to its culture.

Local links
The college has strong links with its four feeder primary schools through the Marrickville District Catholic Schools Council. This structure supports a shared commitment to cooperate towards a complete K–12 perspective in the local educational community. Casimir is a great community that is a great catholic community.

Notable alumni
Jack Bedson, a poet and children's author
Kevin Berry , an Olympic Gold Medalist 200m Butterfly 1964
James Dibble, an ABC newsreader
Jeff Fenech, a champion boxer
Joe Hasham, an actor who played Don Finlayson in Number 96
Trent Merrin, a rugby league football player, who represented NSW in the State of Origin series

See also 

List of Catholic schools in New South Wales
 Catholic education in Australia

References

External links 
 Casimir Catholic College website

Catholic secondary schools in Sydney
Marrickville, New South Wales
1983 establishments in Australia
Educational institutions established in 1983